Ahrab is a historic and ancient municipal district in central part of Tabriz.Company House, one of the historical houses of Tabriz is located in this district.

Famous People 
Mahmud Shaterian, a famous Azerbaijani composer and musician
Huseyn Khundel, an Azerbaijani poet

Sources
Ahrab

Districts of Tabriz